The 6th Annual GMA Dove Awards were held on 1974 recognizing accomplishments of musicians for the year 1973. The show was held in Nashville, Tennessee.

External links
 

GMA Dove Awards
1974 music awards
1974 in Tennessee
1974 in American music
GMA